Burchard of Würzburg (in German Burkard or Burkhard) was an Anglo-Saxon missionary who became the first Bishop of Würzburg (741–751).

Life
He was an Anglo-Saxon Benedictine monk possibly of noble birth, and educated at Malmesbury Abbey. He left England after the death of his parents and joined Boniface (who may have been a relative) in his missionary labors, some time after 732. Burchard lived for a time at the Abbey of St. Peter in Fritzlar, founded by Boniface. Later he left to become a missioner in Thuringia.

When Boniface organized bishoprics in Middle Germany, he placed Burchard over that of Würzburg.  As was customary at the time, his appointment was approved by Carloman (mayor of the palace), who endowed the diocese with a number of benefits. His consecration can not have occurred later than the summer of 741, since in the autumn of that year, he was documented as officiating as a bishop at the consecration of Willibald of Eichstädt.

Pope Zachary confirmed the new bishopric in 743. Burchard appears again as a member of the first German council in 742, and at the general ouncil of the Franks in 747. The following year, as an envoy to Rome from Boniface he presented the results of the council to Pope Zachary. In 750, with Fulrad of Saint-Denis, he brought to Zachary the famous question of Pepin, whose answer was supposed to justify the assumption of regal power by the Carolingians.

In 751, he resigned his see in favor of Megingoz, a Benedictine monk from St. Peter's Abbey in Fritzlar, and retired to a life of solitude. In 752, he dedicated the Abbey of St. Andrew in Würzburg (which was later renamed in his honor). He translated the relics of Saint Kilian to his own cathedral on July 8, 752. Burchard died in 753.

Veneration
His relics were translated to the Abbey of St. Andrew in 986.
His feast day is 14 October.

References

Sources
 Friedrich Wilhelm Bautz: Burchard. In: Biographisch-Bibliographisches Kirchenlexikon (BBKL). Band 1, Bautz, Hamm 1975. 2., unveränderte Auflage Hamm 1990, Sp. 816–817.
 Wilhelm Engel: Burchard. In: Neue Deutsche Biographie (NDB). Band 3, Duncker & Humblot, Berlin 1957, S. 29 (Digitalisat).
 Heinrich Hahn: Burghard. In: Allgemeine Deutsche Biographie (ADB). Band 3, Duncker & Humblot, Leipzig 1876, S. 564–566.
 Konrad Schäfer, Heinrich Schießer: Leben und Wirken des hl. Burkhard (= Bad Neustädter Beiträge zur Geschichte und Heimatkunde Frankens. Band 4). Bad Neustadt a. d. Saale 1986, .
Heinrich Wagner: Würzburger Diözesan Geschichtsblätter (WDGB). Band 65, 2003 (Die Würzburger Bischöfe 741-842), S. 17–43.
 Alfred Wendehorst: Burchard (Nr. 14). In: Lexikon des Mittelalters (LexMA). Band 2, Artemis & Winkler, München/Zürich 1983, Sp. 951.

External links

 https://web.archive.org/web/20150110042227/http://www.weyer-neustadt.de/content/DesktopDefault.aspx?tabid=180
 https://web.archive.org/web/20150110042227/http://www.weyer-neustadt.de/content/DesktopDefault.aspx?tabid=180
 Burkard in the Frisian Chronicle
 

750s deaths
Roman Catholic bishops of Würzburg
8th-century bishops in Bavaria
Medieval German saints
West Saxon saints
8th-century Christian saints
Year of birth unknown